Walter Edward Carter Jr. (born November 4, 1959) is an American retired United States Navy vice admiral and Naval Flight Officer and current academic administrator who is the president of the University of Nebraska System. Carter was confirmed by the university's board of regents as the eighth permanent president of the university on Dec. 5, 2019. He was the 62nd superintendent of the United States Naval Academy and 54th president of the U.S. Naval War College.

Biography
Born in 1959, and a native of Burrillville, Rhode Island, Carter graduated from the U.S. Naval Academy in 1981, was designated a naval flight officer in 1982, and graduated from the Navy Fighter Weapons School (TOPGUN) in 1985. While at USNA, Carter majored in oceanography, lettered in ice hockey 4 years (team captain in 1981), and was editor in chief of the USNA satirical magazine, The LOG, from 1979 to 1981. He is a graduate of the Air War College intermediate course, as well as the Armed Forces Staff College.

His career as a flight officer includes sea assignments in Fighter Squadron 161 (VF-161) on board USS Midway (CVA-41) in Carrier Air Wing Five (CVW-5) and in the VF-21 "Freelancers" on board USS Independence (CV-62) with Carrier Air Wing Fourteen (CVW-14). He commanded the VF-14 "Tophatters", and served as Executive Officer of USS Harry S. Truman (CVN-75), culminating in command of USS Camden (AOE-2) and USS Carl Vinson (CVN-70). His subsequent fleet-command assignment was commander of the Enterprise Carrier Strike Group / Carrier Strike Group Twelve (CSG-12) during Big Es final deployment as a 51-year-old aircraft carrier.

Carter accumulated 6,150 flight hours in the back seat of F-4, F-14, and F/A-18 aircraft during his career and safely accompanied pilots in 2,016 carrier-arrested landings, the record among all active and retired U.S. Naval Aviation designators.  He also flew on 125 combat missions in support of joint operations in Bosnia, Kuwait, Kosovo, Iraq and Afghanistan.

Shore assignments include instructor duty in VF-124 "Gunslingers"; chief of staff for Fighter Wing Pacific; executive assistant to the Deputy Commander, U.S. Central Command; chief of staff for Joint Warfighting Center, United States Joint Forces Command; and commander, Joint Enabling Capabilities Command where he also served as lead for the Transition Planning Team during the disestablishment of U.S. Joint Forces Command. Prior to becoming president of the Naval War College, Carter led Task Force RESILIENT as director, 21st Century Sailor Office (N17). He became the 54th president of the Naval War College on 2 July 2013.

On 23 July 2014, Carter relieved Vice Admiral Michael H. Miller, becoming the 62nd superintendent of the U.S. Naval Academy. He was succeeded by Sean Buck on July 26, 2019.

In January 2020, he was installed as the President of the University of Nebraska System.

Awards and decorations 

In 1999, Carter was awarded the Vice Admiral James Bond Stockdale Award for Inspirational Leadership. 

In 2008, Carter was appointed an Honorary Master Chief by the Master Chief Petty Officer of the Navy. 

In 2009, Carter received the U.S. Navy League's John Paul Jones Award for Inspirational Leadership.

In 2014, Carter was inducted into the Rhode Island Aviation Hall of Fame.  

In 2015, Carter was inducted into the Rhode Island Heritage Hall of Fame.

In 2019, Carter received the USS MIDWAY's Patriot Award in honor of the 50th Anniversary of TOPGUN.  

In 2022, Carter received the U.S. Naval Academy’s Distinguished Graduate Award. He is one of the youngest graduates to receive the award since its inception.

References

Attribution

External links

Living people
People from Burrillville, Rhode Island
United States Naval Academy alumni
United States Naval Flight Officers
United States Navy vice admirals
Recipients of the Legion of Merit
Recipients of the Distinguished Flying Cross (United States)
Recipients of the Air Medal
Recipients of the Defense Superior Service Medal
Recipients of the Vice Admiral James Bond Stockdale Award for Inspirational Leadership
American aviation record holders
1959 births